Cabalodontia is a genus of fungi in the family Steccherinaceae. The genus was circumscribed by Marcen Piątek in 2004 for five species formerly placed in Phlebia. It is named in honour of Polish phycologist Jolanta Cabała. The type species, C. queletii, has an odontoid hymenophore featuring toothlike projections.

Species
Cabalodontia bresadolae (Parmasto) Piątek (2004)
Cabalodontia cretacea (Romell ex Bourdot & Galzin) Piątek (2004)
Cabalodontia livida (Fr. ex Burt) Piątek (2004)
Cabalodontia queletii (Bourdot & Galzin) Piątek (2004)
Cabalodontia subcretacea (Litsch.) Piątek (2004)

References

Steccherinaceae
Polyporales genera
Taxa described in 2004